Play For Your Life is an isometric 3D sports simulation game produced by Ocean for the Sinclair Spectrum and published by Your Sinclair as a cover tape game in 1988. The game is a simulation of a futuristic tennis-like sport played by robots with bats in an enclosed room.

Gameplay 
The player controls a robot with a bat attempting to hit a ball at a circular target on the opposing wall. Alternatively, the player may try to kill the opponent by hitting it with the ball or bat. The computer-controlled opposing player is trying to do the same.

As the game progresses more balls are brought into play, up to a limit of four. A round is won when one player scores three goals or kills the opponent.

There are 26 levels of varying difficulty. Later levels feature movable barriers and various other obstacles to complicate play.

References

External links 

1988 video games
Video games developed in the United Kingdom
Video games with isometric graphics
ZX Spectrum games
ZX Spectrum-only games
Fantasy sports video games